Southern flag may refer to:

Flag of South Africa
Flag of South Carolina
Flag of South Dakota
Flag of South Korea
Flag of South Sudan
Flag of South Vietnam
Flag of the Confederate States of America